Ali Abbasi (born 1981) is an Iranian filmmaker. He is best known for his films Shelley (2016), Border (2018), and Holy Spider (2022). Abbasi also directed the last two episodes of the first season of the series The Last of Us. He has received various accolades, including an Un Certain Regard award and four Robert Awards, in addition to nominations for seven European Film Awards, a Goya Award, and two Guldbagge Awards.

Early life
Abbasi attended Tehran Polytechnic until 2002, when he emigrated to Sweden to study architecture at the KTH Royal Institute of Technology in Stockholm. After earning his bachelor of arts in 2007, he enrolled at the National Film School of Denmark, earning a degree in 2011 with the short film M for Markus.

Abbasi lives in Copenhagen and continues to hold an Iranian passport.

Career
In 2018, Abbasi premiered his second film, Border. It won the Un Certain Regard award at the Cannes Film Festival, was selected as the Swedish entry for the Best Foreign Language Film at the 91st Academy Awards. Even though the film didn't get a nomination in that category, it earned a nomination for Best Makeup and Hairstyling.

His third feature film, Holy Spider, came out in 2022 and was a Persian-language co-production between Sweden, Denmark, France, and Germany. Based on the true story of Saeed Hanaei, a serial killer who targeted sex workers and killed sixteen women from 2000 to 2001 in Mashhad, Iran, the film depicts a fictional female journalist investigating a serial killer.

The film was selected to compete for the Palme d'Or at the 2022 Cannes Film Festival, where it premiered on 22 May 2022. Zar Amir Ebrahimi, who starred in the film, won the festival's Best Actress Award.  The film was selected as the Danish entry for Best International Feature Film at the 95th Academy Awards, and made the December shortlist.

Filmography

Film

Television

Critical reception

Awards and nominations

References

External links
 

1981 births
Living people
Iranian film directors
Iranian expatriates in Denmark
Iranian expatriates in Sweden